Don Norman was the head coach for North Dakota for two seasons in the late 1940s.

Head coaching record

References 

North Dakota Fighting Hawks men's ice hockey coaches
Year of birth missing